Macropodiella is a genus of flowering plants in the family Podostemaceae. There are four to six species, all native to Africa.

These are aquatic herbs found in freshwater. The leaves are linear, threadlike, or scale-like. The flowers are solitary or in clusters, and each has two tepals.

Species include:
Macropodiella garrettii
Macropodiella heteromorpha
Macropodiella macrothyrsa
Macropodiella pellucida (Engl.) C.Cusset
Macropodiella taylorii

References

Podostemaceae
Malpighiales genera
Taxonomy articles created by Polbot